Aechmea coelestis is a species of flowering plant in the genus Aechmea. This is a species that is native to southeastern Brazil from Espírito Santo to Santa Catarina.

Cultivars
Cultivars include:

 Aechmea 'Beads of Coral'
 Aechmea 'Golden Beads'
 Aechmea 'Hal Ellis'
 Aechmea 'Mauve Beads'
 Aechmea 'Mondamin'
 Aechmea 'Pink Beads'

References

coelestis
Flora of Brazil
Plants described in 1856